Boris Klaiman (sometimes Kleyman or Kleiman, ; born 26 October 1990) is a professional footballer who plays as a goalkeeper for Greek Super League club Volos. Born in what is today Ukraine, he represents the Israel national team.

Club career
Klaiman was born in Vinnytsia, Soviet Ukraine, and when he was ten months old, immigrated to Israel with his family. He began his career in the Hapoel Tel Aviv and Hapoel Kfar Saba youth teams, then joined Hapoel Tel Aviv senior team before the 2009–10 season. He played on loan at Maccabi Herzliya before returning to Hapoel Kfar Saba.

Hapoel Kfar Saba
As a child began to play football in the youth system of Hapoel Tel Aviv, and then moved to the youth department of Hapoel Kfar Saba. On 15 August 2008, he made his debut for the first team, in a draw 0–0 against Hapoel Ra'anana at 2008–09. At this season Klaiman played 13 games at the first team.

Hapoel Tel Aviv
In summer 2009, Klamian moved back to Hapoel Tel Aviv, and was loaned to Maccabi Herzliya for half season. In January 2010, he returned to Hapoel Tel Aviv, and was a second goalkeeper during  Vincent Enyeama played 2010 Africa Cup of Nations. Klaiman didn't share Hapoel Tel Aviv games this season, but was part of a squad team that won the double at the end of the season. In summer 2010 on loaned back to Hapoel Kfar Saba, to get playing time.

In summer 2011, Klaiman returned to Hapoel Tel Aviv, as a second goalkeeper for Apoula Edel. On 31 July 2011 he made his debut for Hapoel Tel Aviv, as he came on as a substitute after Edel got red card at Tel Aviv derby. On 29 October 2011 he made his debut in the Israeli Premier League, coming on as a substitute 6–0 victory against Hapoel Rishon LeZion. At this season he played in 8 games, and at the end of the season won with the team of Israel State Cup. At 2012–13 season played 10 games.

In summer 2013 Danny Amos signed to Hapoel Tel Aviv, and Klaiman again began the season as second goalkeeper. After the 3rd round Amos was injured, and Klaiman impressed when he played and even called up to the Israel national football team's squad. At this season he played 11 games.

Beitar Jerusalem
On 7 August 2014, Klaiman signed a three-year in Beitar Jerusalem. On 13 August 2014, Klaiman made his debut at the club, at the 1–2 loss to Hapoel Petah Tikva at the Toto Cup. On 27 October 2014 Klaiman saved penalty the 82nd minute at the 2–0 victory against his former team Hapoel Tel Aviv after a bad kick of Yisrael Zaguri.
On 22 May 2018 Klaiman left Beitar Jerusalem.

Enosis Neon Paralimni
On 23 July 2018, Cypriot side Enosis Neon Paralimni FC announced the signing of Klaiman for a two years contract with an undisclosed fee.

Volos
On 1 August 2020, Klaiman signed for two years with Super League Greece club Volos F.C.

International career
At youth international level, Klaiman was capped in Israel at levels from under-18 to under-21. On 11 August 2009 he made his debut for Israel U21 against Serbia. In June 2013 he took part at 2013 UEFA European Under-21 Championship and used as a first goalkeeper. Totally Klamian has 21 appearances for the Israeli youth team.

On 4 October 2013, he was called up for the senior Israeli squad, ahead of the matches against Portugal and Northern Ireland. On 23 March 2016, he made his senior debut with Israel, in a friendly match against Croatia that ended in a 2–0 away loss.

Honours
Hapoel Tel Aviv
Israeli Premier League: 2009–10
Israel State Cup: 2009–10, 2010–11

References

External links

 

1990 births
Living people
Footballers from Vinnytsia
Israeli footballers
Hapoel Kfar Saba F.C. players
Hapoel Tel Aviv F.C. players
Maccabi Herzliya F.C. players
Beitar Jerusalem F.C. players
Enosis Neon Paralimni FC players
Volos N.F.C. players
Israeli Premier League players
Liga Leumit players
Cypriot First Division players
Super League Greece players
Expatriate footballers in Cyprus
Expatriate footballers in Greece
Israeli expatriate sportspeople in Cyprus
Israeli expatriate sportspeople in Greece
Israel international footballers
Israel under-21 international footballers
Soviet emigrants to Israel
Ukrainian emigrants to Israel
Footballers from Kfar Saba
Association football goalkeepers